Liam James Wood (born 30 March 1998) is a New Zealand professional footballer who plays as central defender for Team Wellington.

He made his professional debut for Wellington Phoenix on 1 August 2017 in their round of 32 FFA Cup match against A-League side Western Sydney Wanderers FC.

References

External links

1998 births
Living people
Association football defenders
New Zealand association footballers
Wellington Phoenix FC players